Peleopoda semocrossa is a moth in the family Depressariidae. It was described by Edward Meyrick in 1930. It is found in Bolivia.

The wingspan is about 19 mm. The forewings are white, with a very faint yellowish tinge. There is a light greyish-ochreous transverse streak on the end of the cell. The hindwings are white.

References

Moths described in 1930
Peleopoda